Pavithreswaram  is a village in Kottarakkara taluk of Kollam district in the state of Kerala, India.

Demographics 
As of 2001 India census, Pavithreswaram had a population of 26,082: 12,458 males and 13,624 females.

Schools
K.N.N.M.H.S.S&V.H.S.S
VHSS Kuzhikkalidavaka
Kuzhikkal Edavaka VHS School
K.N.N.M.T.T.I
 N.S.S LPS Edavattom, Karuvelil PO
 K.S.M.V.H.S.S.Edavattom, Karuvelil PO

Hospitals 
Government Homoeo Dispensary

Temples
Sree Mahadevar Temple
Mayam kottu Malanada Temple
Kulakkara Sree Mahavishnu Temple, Edavattom, Karuvelil Po
Mannathu Muhoorthi Temple, Edavattom
Maranadu Mullavelil Mahavishnu Temple
Kaithacodu Endelayappan Temple
Karalil Devi temple
Malanada Appooppan Temple
Alassery Sree Bhadra Devi Temple, Alasseril Junction, Pavithreswaram
 Bhajanamadam Sreekrishna Swami Temple
 Udayankavu Siva Temple, Poreeckal, Edavattom, Karuvelil PO

Churches
St. Thevodorose Orthodox Syrian Church, Madhavassery, Pavithreswaram (p.o), Puthoor

Cashew factories 
Bismilla Cashew Company
Galaxy Cashew Factory
Kauvery Cashew Factory
KSCDC No.18
Mahavishnu Cashew Factory
Prakash Cashew Factory
Pranavam Cashew company
Raja Cashew Company
St: George Cashew Company

Quarries
Granite
Brick/Tile clay

References

External links

Villages in Kollam district